Iratumumab is a human monoclonal antibody used in the treatment of oncological diseases such as relapsed refractory CD30-positive lymphoma including Hodgkin's disease.

This drug was developed by Medarex, which was later acquired by Bristol-Myers Squibb.

The FDA granted orphan drug designation for Hodgkin's lymphoma in 2004. In 2009, development was suspended with no explanation given.

References 

Monoclonal antibodies for tumors
Experimental cancer drugs